Henry Howorth (ca. 1746-11 May 1783) was an English barrister and Member of Parliament (MP).

The father of Henry Howorth was a cleric, Henry Robert Howorth, of Maesllwch in Radnorshire and his great-uncle was Humphrey Howorth. He attended Westminster School, was admitted to Lincoln's Inn in October 1764 and called to the Bar in May 1769. In 1780, Howorth was appointed recorder at Abingdon, Berkshire, and was also appointed King's Counsel.

He was elected to House of Commons from the Abingdon constituency in 1782. A keen sailor, he drowned on 11 May 1783 in the River Thames near his house at Mortlake. He had succeeded John Mayor as MP for the seat, Mayor having resigned it in December 1782 for reasons that are unclear.

Howorth was unmarried but left a bequest to four illegitimate children born of Mary Chippendale. He was succeeded as MP for Abingdon by Edward Loveden Loveden.

References 

1740s births
1783 deaths
People educated at Westminster School, London
British MPs 1780–1784
English barristers
Members of Lincoln's Inn
Deaths by drowning in the United Kingdom